Beau Williams (born January 6, 1950) is an American gospel singer from Texas. Through Light Records he released an album Wonderful, which reached a number two on the Billboard Gospel charts.

Musical career

Early years
Williams grew up in Houston, Texas, the son of a Baptist preacher and choir director. Williams began as a regular on a live television show and had a regional hit record as Bobo Mr Soul, in his hometown of Houston, Texas whilst still a teenager. He appeared on Star Search in 1984 (where he defeated the thirteen-week-long champion Sam Harris).

Recording career
Williams' albums with Capitol Records include a self-titled album in 1982, Stay with Me (1983), Bodacious! (1984), No More Tears (1986).  "C'est La Vie", track 3 on his 1984 album, was later covered in 1986 by singer-songwriter Robbie Nevil, who also co-wrote the song in 1984.

After his third Capitol release, Williams signed with Light Records and returned to his roots in Gospel music. Summing up ten of his career highlights in the gospel field, The Best of Beau Williams was issued in 1995.

His 1989 project, "Wonderful" debuted at the number nine spot on Billboard's chart, landed at two, and stayed in the top ten family for fifty eight consecutive weeks. In the meantime, it earned a Dove Award for "Song of the Year", and Grammy, Stellar, and James Cleveland Award nominations.

Williams' recent releases include 2005's "Visions" & 2002's "The Greatest Gift". His other recordings include Higher, Love, Power, They Need to Know, Covenant Brothers, and This Christmas.

Other appearances
He was an anthem singer for the Los Angeles Lakers for six years, and has also performed for the Texas Rangers (MLB), Dallas Cowboys (NFL), and Houston Rockets (NBA). Beau Williams regularly appeared on Robert Tilton's Success-N-Life television program, which aired on BET from 1997 to 2007; and also appears periodically on the Trinity Broadcasting Network (TBN), a religious broadcasting network.

Discography

Albums

Singles

References

External links
 Beau Williams on AllMusic.
 Discography at Discogs.

American gospel singers
1950 births
Living people